Anitha Kumaraswamy is an Indian politician and businesswoman working in entertainment industry. Currently she is a member of the Karnataka Legislative Assembly from Ramanagara and earlier represented Madhugiri from 2008 to 2013. She belongs to Janata Dal (Secular) party. She is married to H. D. Kumaraswamy.

Personal life
Anitha Kumaraswamy was born in Talagavara, Chintamani taluk, Chickballapur District of Karnataka. She married H. D. Kumaraswamy in 1986, and they have a son named Nikhil Gowda and is the daughter-in-law of former Prime Minister of India H. D. Deve Gowda.

References

External links 
Anitha Kumaraswamy affidavit

Janata Dal (Secular) politicians
Women members of the Karnataka Legislative Assembly
Living people
Karnataka MLAs 2008–2013
21st-century Indian women politicians
21st-century Indian politicians
Year of birth missing (living people)